Bascanichthys congoensis is an eel in the family Ophichthidae (worm/snake eels). It was described by Jacques Blache and Jean Cadenat in 1971. It is a tropical, marine eel which is known solely from Pointe Noire, Democratic Republic of Congo, (from which its species epithet is derived) in the eastern Atlantic Ocean. It inhabits bays, where it burrows in mud and sand. Males can reach a maximum total length of 62.3 centimetres.

References

Ophichthidae
Fish of the Atlantic Ocean
Fish described in 1971
Taxa named by Jean Cadenat